Gorgona could refer to:

 Gorgona Island (Colombia), an island about 50 km off the Pacific coast
 Gorgona (Italy), the northernmost island in the Tuscan Archipelago
 Gorgona Agricultural Penal Colony, penal colony located on the Italian Island
 Gorgona (wine), Italian white wine made by the prisoners of the Gorgona Agricultural Penal Colony in partnership with the Frescobaldi family
 Gorgona, a fictional planet; see Planets in science fiction
 Gorgona Group, a mid-20th century modernist art group
 Gorgona-class transport ship
 Gorgona, the transliteration of γοργόνα, which is the mermaid in Greek.